Yevgeny Mikhaylov (born 17 January 1937) is a Soviet athlete. He competed in the men's triple jump at the 1960 Summer Olympics.

References

1937 births
Living people
Athletes (track and field) at the 1960 Summer Olympics
Soviet male triple jumpers
Olympic athletes of the Soviet Union
Place of birth missing (living people)